Zabal Castle  is a castle in the north of the city of Sakaka in the Al-Jouf region in the north of Saudi Arabia.

Location 
Zaabal Castle is a castle in the north of Skaka city in al-Jouf region in northern Saudi Arabia.   Located at the head of a mountain at the north-west end of Skaka, a wall built of stone and clay with four towers in its corners and the castle is reached by a single and winding road, the castle has stood the protector of the city for a long period of time due to the strength of its fortifications and difficulty to reach it, and the people are trading legendary stories about this castle and standing steadfast in the face of the invaders who wanted to demolish it for its strategic importance.

History 

The age of the Za’abal Fort is about 900 years. While the age of the current fort is about 400 years. Probably the building was built on the old building ruins, which goes back to the Nabataean Times. Beside the fort, there is Sisra Well, the well is carved by the rock, and its goes back to the  Nabataean Times. However, inside the well there is a stairs to go down. Then, at the bottom of the well there is a crevice, which helps to conveyance the water to the whole city. At the end, the well link Al-Qasr area with Al-Laqa’et area, by a tunnel underground. While in the west side of the mountain there is the Prince Mountain which contain inscription and rock charges.

Description 
Sheikh Hamad Al-Jasser wrote: "This fort has no mention of our sources, and its effects indicate that it was built before Islam, and it is like the guardian of a large area of the country of the hollow is Skaka and its proximity to the farms and villages scattered in a wide range of land.
English writer Lady Anne Blunt also wrote: "Skaka Al jouf, with an old castle perched at an altitude of about 100 feet, controls the city."
Finnish traveller Georg August Wallin said: "Skaka has a ruined fortress known as Zaabal, and there are also four neighborhoods or markets."

Gallery

References

General references
Castles and Forts, Tara International Company, Riyadh, 1433 AH, p. 143
ibid. p. 143
Bilad al-Jawf or Dumat al-Jandal, Geographical, Historical, Social, and Literary Research, Saad bin Abdullah bin Junaidl, 1st edition, Dar Al Yamamah Publications for Research, Translation and Publishing, 1401 AH / 1981AD, p. 57.
Al-Jawf, an ancient history and a bright present, Faris bin Hamad Al-Nassery, 1422 AH / 2002 AD, p. 21.

Castles in Saudi Arabia